The Woodlane Plantation is a historic plantation with a mansion in Eufaula, Alabama, U.S.. It was established as a cotton and tobacco plantation in the 1850s for John W. Raines. The mansion was designed in the Greek Revival architectural style, and its construction was completed in 1852. By the 1880s, it was the home of Reuben Kolb. It has been listed on the National Register of Historic Places since March 29, 2006.

References

Houses on the National Register of Historic Places in Alabama
Greek Revival architecture in Alabama
Houses completed in 1852
Houses in Barbour County, Alabama
Plantations in Alabama
1852 establishments in Alabama